The Whitesand River is a river in the Unorganized Part of Thunder Bay District in Northwestern Ontario, Canada, part of the Hewitson River system.

Course
The lake travels west, then turns south near the site of a mine. The Whitesand River then travels downstream via a series of lakes, including Cleaver Lake, Zenith Lake, Demijohn Lake, Gumboot Lake, Longcanoe Lake and Hornblende Lake. The Whitesand River's waters flow from Whitesand Lake via the Hewitson River over the Rainbow Falls into Lake Superior.

Economy
An access road to the mine runs from Highway 17 along the river. A campground of Rainbow Falls Provincial Park is on the south side of Whitesand Lake opposite the mouth of the Whitesand River.

See also
List of rivers of Ontario

References

Rivers of Thunder Bay District
Tributaries of Lake Superior